The 1420 Caldera earthquake shook the southern portion of Atacama Desert on September 1 and caused tsunamis in Chile as well as Hawaii and the towns of  Japan. The earthquake is thought to have had a size of 8.8–9.4 . Historical records of the tsunami exist for the Japanese harbours of Kawarago and Aiga where confused residents saw the water recede in the morning of September 1, without any sign of an earthquake. In Chile, rockfalls occurred along the coast as well, producing blocks of up to 40 tons that are now found inland. This is also consistent with the identification of a possible tsunami deposit in Mejillones Bay that has been dated to the range 1409 to 1449. Deposits found by coring of recent sediments in wetland near Tongoy Bay have also been linked to the 1420 tsunami.

See also 
 List of historical earthquakes
 List of earthquakes in Chile
 List of earthquakes in Peru

References

1420
1420 in Asia
Megathrust earthquakes in Chile
Caldera earthquake
15th-century earthquakes
History of Atacama Region
Medieval tsunamis
Pre-Columbian natural disasters
Tsunamis in Chile
Tsunamis in Japan
Tsunamis in the United States